Forever Becoming is the fifth studio album by American post-metal band Pelican. The album was released on October 15, 2013 through Southern Lord Records. Forever Becoming marks Pelican's first release to not include founding guitarist Laurent Schroeder-Lebec.

Prior to the album's release, Pelican released an online stream of "Immutable Dusk" in July, 2013. "Deny the Absolute" was released as a stand-alone single in August, 2013, and later as a music video in December, 2014. An online stream of "The Cliff" was released in September, 2013, and was followed by The Cliff as a separate EP in 2015.

Background and composition
Forever Becoming is the first Pelican album since its inception in 2001 to not feature founding guitarist Laurent Schroeder-Lebec. He withdrew from touring with Pelican in 2010, told his fellow band members that his "heart wasn't fully in it" following the recording of the 2012 EP Ataraxia/Taraxis, and publicly announced his departure two months after the release of the EP in June 2012. Schroeder-Lebec left to spend more time with his family. Pelican originally planned to carry on as a three-piece band, but then-touring guitarist Dallas Thomas of The Swan King became a full-time member and ended up contributing to the writing process of Forever Becoming. On working with Thomas, guitarist Trevor de Brauw said, "[Bassist Bryan Herweg] and I are more freewheeling. We don't have every detail worked out, whereas [Dallas Thomas] is very meticulous and really likes to have things thought out. Having that balance means we're not going to veer too far in either direction."

On the sound of Forever Becoming, de Brauw described it as being "a lot darker, depressive, and angry," which he attributed to the "nervous headspace" caused by continuing on without Schroeder-Lebec. The increased aggression of the album drew positive reactions from critics. While songs on some of Pelican's more recent albums experimented with a traditional or pop structures, the songs on Forever Becoming were designed to feature a narrative or journey, with songs intentionally ending very differently from where they began.

Forever Becoming was produced by Chris Common, formerly of These Arms Are Snakes, who also previously produced Pelican's 2009 studio album, What We All Come to Need.

2019 Remix
In February 2019, Pelican and Southern Lord announced a deluxe vinyl reissue of Forever Becoming. In a statement from Southern Lord, the label stated that the band was satisfied with the original recordings, but the post-production mixing and mastering was done in a makeshift studio that was set up in "less-than-ideal circumstances" that was said to have "varnished the incredible tones generated during tracking". The original producer Chris Common returned to remix and remaster the album at his own studio. Southern Lord said he brought "a new level of low-end depth, atmospheric clarity, and tight, punchy heaviness to the album." All streaming sites updated their version of Forever Becoming to the 2019 Remix version. In addition refreshed audio, the 2019 reissue also features the formerly Japan-only bonus track "Bardo" and the version of "The Cliff" from The Cliff EP with Allen Epley providing vocals (in addition to the original version).

Critical reception

Forever Becoming was met with positive reception. The album received an average score of 74/100 from 10 reviews on Metacritic, indicating "generally favorable reviews". Gregory Heaney of AllMusic wrote, "it seems the change in membership has reinvigorated them, providing their songs with a sense of stability that shines through on an album that easily ranks as some of the band's most exciting work in recent years." Writing for The A.V. Club, Jason Heller praised Forever Becoming, saying that "by stepping back and taking stock, Pelican has reconnected with what made it a pioneer in the first place: force, vision, and soul." Pitchfork writer Colin St. John said lauded the album's heightened aggression, saying the unusual heaviness proves that the band still has life left. However, not all critics were impressed by the efforts of this new version of Pelican; in a more middling review, PopMatters writer Brice Ezell (who had praised the band's previous EP) criticized Forever Becoming for regressing in quality and style.

Track listing

Personnel 
Forever Becoming personnel according to liner notes.

Pelican
 Bryan Herweg
 Larry Herweg
 Trevor Shelley de Brauw
 Dallas Thomas

Additional musicians
 Chris Common – mellotron on "Threnody," additional drums on "The Tundra" and piano on "Perpetual Dawn"
 Bruce Lamont – baritone sax on "Terminal"

Production and recording
 Chris Common – recording, mixing
 Joe Lambert – mastering
 Jon San Paolo – assistant engineering
 Gregoire Yechen – assistant engineering

Art and design
 Stephen O'Malley – collage design
 Andrew Weiss – photography

Chart positions

References

External links 
Forever Becoming (2019 Remix) on Bandcamp

2013 albums
Southern Lord Records albums
Pelican (band) albums